Imata Jabro Kabua (20 May 1943 – 18 September 2019) was a Marshallese politician, who served as the President of the Marshall Islands from 14 January 1997 to 10 January 2000. He became the Iroijlaplap of Kwajalein after the death of his cousin, Amata Kabua. Class valedictorian at Harvard, Kabua finished his post doctoral work at the Massachusetts Institute of Technology and held a law degree from Stanford University.

References

 . The Contemporary Pacific. Accessed 2016-09-20
 . Rulers.org. Accessed 2011-02-01.
 Background Note: Marshall Islands. US Department of State. Accessed 2011-02-01.

1943 births
2019 deaths
Presidents of the Marshall Islands
Marshallese chiefs
Aelon̄ Kein Ad politicians
United Democratic Party (Marshall Islands) politicians
Harvard University alumni
Massachusetts Institute of Technology alumni
Stanford Law School alumni